In mathematics, the outer automorphism group of a group, is the quotient, where  is the automorphism group of  and ) is the subgroup consisting of inner automorphisms. The outer automorphism group is usually denoted . If  is trivial and  has a trivial center, then  is said to be complete.

An automorphism of a group which is not inner is called an outer automorphism. If the inner automorphism group is trivial (when a group is abelian), the automorphism group and outer automorphism group are naturally identified; that is, the outer automorphism group does act on the group.

For example, for the alternating group, the outer automorphism group is usually the group of order 2, with exceptions noted below.

Structure 
The Schreier conjecture asserts that  is always a solvable group when  is a finite simple group. This result is now known to be true as a corollary of the classification of finite simple groups, although no simpler proof is known.

As dual of the center 
The kernel of the conjugation map is the center, while the cokernel is the outer automorphism group (and the image is the inner automorphism group). This can be summarized by the exact sequence:
.

Applications 
The outer automorphism group of a group acts on conjugacy classes, and accordingly on the character table. See details at character table: outer automorphisms.

Topology of surfaces 
The outer automorphism group is important in the topology of surfaces because there is a connection provided by the Dehn–Nielsen theorem: the extended mapping class group of the surface is the outer automorphism group of its fundamental group.

In finite groups
For the outer automorphism groups of all finite simple groups see the list of finite simple groups. Sporadic simple groups and alternating groups (other than the alternating group, ; see below) all have outer automorphism groups of order 1 or 2. These extensions are not always semidirect products, as the case of the alternating group  shows; a precise criterion for this to happen was given in 2003.

In symmetric and alternating groups 

The outer automorphism group of a finite simple group in some infinite family of finite simple groups can almost always be given by a uniform formula that works for all elements of the family. There is just one exception to this: the alternating group  has outer automorphism group of order 4, rather than 2 as do the other simple alternating groups (given by conjugation by an odd permutation). Equivalently the symmetric group  is the only symmetric group with a non-trivial outer automorphism group.

A similar result holds for any ,  odd.

In reductive algebraic groups

Let  now be a connected reductive group over an algebraically closed field. Then any two Borel subgroups are conjugate by an inner automorphism, so to study outer automorphisms it suffices to consider automorphisms that fix a given Borel subgroup. Associated to the Borel subgroup is a set of simple roots, and the outer automorphism may permute them, while preserving the structure of the associated Dynkin diagram.

In complex and real simple Lie algebras

 

splits. In the complex simple case, this is a classical result, whereas for real simple Lie algebras, this fact has been proven as recently as 2010.

Word play
The term outer automorphism lends itself to word play: the term outermorphism is sometimes used for outer automorphism, and a particular geometry on which  acts is called outer space.

See also
Mapping class group
Out(F)

References

External links

Group theory
Group automorphisms